Skobalj is a village in the municipality of Smederevo, Serbia. According to the 2002 census, the village has a population of 1880 people.

Skobalj, being very small village, is mostly known as a birthplace of Dafina Milanović, founder of Dafiment Bank, who committed one of the largest Ponzi scheme monetary fraud in former Yugoslavia.

References

Populated places in Podunavlje District